Jiefang Daily, also translated as Liberation Daily, is the official daily newspaper of the Shanghai committee of the Chinese Communist Party (CCP).

History
Jiefang Daily was first published on May 28, 1949, in Shanghai. From 1941 to 1947, a newspaper with the same name was published in Yan'an, which published the famous editorial Without the Communist Party, There Would Be No New China on August 25, 1943.

In October 2020, the United States Department of State designated Jiefang Daily as a foreign mission of China.

Overview
Published by the Shanghai Municipal Government, Jiefang Daily is a general newspaper covering East China. The paper reports domestic and international news. And its primary readership covers decision makers and business executives in governmental agencies and local enterprises.

Jiefang Daily is the Party newspaper for the Shanghai committee of the CCP. After Shanghai was taken over by the People's Liberation Army from the Kuomintang government, the newspaper started publication on May 28, 1949, by continuing to use the name of the central government's former Party newspaper Jiefang Daily published in the communist base Yan'an in northern Shaanxi Province.

The newspaper has been published in folio size since 1988. It has readers in Shanghai's townships and countryside and many other places in China, and it has some overseas subscribers as well.

Published under Jiefang Daily are also some newspapers including English Newspaper for Shanghai Students, Newspaper Digest, Life in Party Branch and Serial Stories, whose circulations range between several tens to several hundreds of thousands. Among them, the circulation of Newspaper Digest stands at more than 2.7 million for each issue. After the Cultural Revolution, the newspaper took the lead to resume commercial advertising.

See also
 Wenhui Daily
 Xinmin Evening News
 Youth Daily

References

External links 
 Official website

Newspapers published in Shanghai
Chinese-language newspapers (Simplified Chinese)
Chinese Communist Party newspapers
1949 establishments in China
Publications established in 1949
State media
Chinese propaganda organisations
Propaganda newspapers and magazines